The Kentucky District Courts are the state courts of limited jurisdiction in the U.S. state of Kentucky.

Jurisdiction and bench
The District Courts are trial courts of limited jurisdiction that hear misdemeanor criminal cases, traffic violations, violations of county and municipal ordinances and small claims. They also have concurrent jurisdiction with the family court division of the Circuit Court over proceedings involving domestic violence and abuse, the Uniform Parentage Act and Uniform Interstate Family Support Act, dependency, child abuse and neglect, and juvenile status offenses.

Appeals from decisions of the District Courts are made to the corresponding Circuit Court for that particular district. Further appeals can be made on a discretionary basis to the Kentucky Court of Appeals as well as the Kentucky Supreme Court.

Districts

First District – Hickman and Fulton counties
Second District – McCracken county
Third District – Christian county
Fourth District – Hopkins county
Fifth District – Crittenden, Webster, and Union counties
Sixth District – Daviess county
Seventh District – Logan and Todd counties
Eighth District – Warren county
Ninth District – Hardin county
Tenth District – Hart and LaRue counties
Eleventh District – Taylor, Green, Marion, and Washington counties
Twelfth District – Oldham, Henry, and Trimble counties
Thirteenth District - Garrard, Jessamine, and Lincoln counties
Fourteenth District - Bourbon, Scott, and Woodford counties
Fifteenth District - Carroll, Grant, and Owen counties
Sixteenth District - Kenton county
Seventeenth District - Campbell county
Eighteenth District - Harrison, Nicholas, Pendleton and Robertson counties
Nineteenth District - Bracken, Fleming, and Mason counties
Twentieth District - Greenup and Lewis counties
Twenty-first District - Bath, Menifee, Montgomery, and Rowan counties
Twenty-second District - Fayette county
Twenty-third District - Estill, Lee, and Owsley counties
Twenty-fourth District - Johnson, Lawrence, and Martin counties
Twenty-fifth District - Clark and Madison counties
Twenty-sixth District - Harlan county
Twenty-seventh District - Knox and Laurel counties
Twenty-eighth District - Pulaski and Rockcastle counties
Twenty-ninth District - Adair and Casey counties
Thirtieth District - Jefferson county
Thirty-first District - Floyd county
Thirty-second District - Boyd county
Thirty-third District - Perry county
Thirty-fourth District - McCreary and Whitley counties
Thirty-fifth District - Pike county
Thirty-sixth District - Knott and Magoffin counties
Thirty-seventh District - Carter, Elliott, and Morgan counties
Thirty-eighth District - Butler, Edmonson, Hancock, and Ohio counties
Thirty-ninth District - Breathitt, Powell, and Wolfe counties
Fortieth District - Clinton, Russell, and Wayne counties
Forty-first District - Clay, Jackson, and Leslie counties
Forty-second District - Calloway county
Forty-third District - Barren and Metcalfe counties
Forty-fourth District - Bell county
Forty-fifth District - McLean and Muhlenberg counties
Forty-sixth District - Breckinridge, Grayson, and Meade counties
Forty-seventh District - Letcher county
Forty-eighth District - Franklin county
Forty-ninth District - Allen and Simpson counties
Fiftieth District - Boyle and Mercer counties
Fifty-first District - Henderson county
Fifty-second District - Graves county
Fifty-third District - Anderson, Shelby, and Spencer counties
Fifty-fourth District - Boone and Gallatin counties
Fifty-fifth District - Bullitt county
Fifty-sixth District - Caldwell, Livingston, Lyon, and Trigg counties
Fifty-seventh District - Nelson county
Fifty-eighth District - Marshall county
Fifty-ninth District - Ballard and Carlisle counties
Sixtieth District - Cumberland and Monroe counties

References

External links
District Court on the Kentucky Court of Justice website

Kentucky state courts
Courts and tribunals with year of establishment missing